The Second Congo War, also known as the Great War of Africa or the Great African War and sometimes referred to as the African World War, began in the Democratic Republic of the Congo in August 1998, little more than a year after the First Congo War, and involved some of the same issues. The war officially ended in July 2003, when the Transitional Government of the Democratic Republic of the Congo took power. Although a peace agreement was signed in 2002, violence has continued in many regions of the country, especially in the east. Hostilities have continued since in the ongoing Lord's Resistance Army insurgency, and the Kivu and Ituri conflicts. Nine African countries and around twenty-five armed groups became involved in the war.

By 2008, the war and its aftermath had caused 5.4 million deaths, principally through disease and malnutrition, making the Second Congo War the deadliest conflict worldwide since World War II. Another 2 million were displaced from their homes or sought asylum in neighboring countries. Conflict minerals were a major source of funding for the war, and for subsequent fighting.

Background

Kabila's march to Kinshasa

The First Congo War began in 1996 as Rwanda increasingly expressed concern that Hutu members of Rassemblement Démocratique pour le Rwanda (RDR) militias were carrying out cross-border raids from what was then Zaire, and planning an invasion of Rwanda. The militias, mostly Hutu, had entrenched themselves in refugee camps in eastern Zaire, where many had fled to escape the Tutsi-dominated Rwandan Patriotic Front (RPF) in the aftermath of the Rwandan genocide of 1994.

The Tutsi-dominated RPF government of Rwanda, which had gained power in July 1994, protested this violation of Rwandan territorial integrity, and began to arm the ethnically Tutsi Banyamulenge of eastern Zaire. The Mobutu regime of Zaire vigorously denounced this intervention, but possessed neither the military capability to halt it nor the political capital to attract international assistance.

With active support from Uganda, Rwanda and Angola, the Tutsi forces of Laurent-Désiré Kabila moved methodically down the Congo River, encountering only light resistance from the poorly trained, ill-disciplined forces of Mobutu's crumbling regime. The bulk of Kabila's fighters were Tutsis, and many were veterans of various conflicts in the Great Lakes region of Africa. Kabila himself had credibility as a long-time political opponent of Mobutu, and had been a follower of Patrice Lumumba (the first Prime Minister of the independent Congo), who was executed by a combination of internal and external forces in January 1961, and was ultimately replaced by Mobutu in 1965. Kabila had declared himself a Marxist and an admirer of Mao Zedong. He had been waging armed rebellion in eastern Zaire for more than three decades, though Che Guevara in his account of the early years of the conflict portrayed him as an uncommitted and uninspiring leader.

Kabila's army began a slow movement west in December 1996, near the end of the Great Lakes refugee crisis, taking control of border towns and mines and solidifying control. There were reports of massacres and of brutal repression by the rebel army. A UN human-rights investigator published statements from witnesses claiming that Kabila's Alliance of Democratic Forces for the Liberation of Congo (ADFLC) had committed massacres, and that the advancing army had killed as many as 60,000 civilians, a claim the ADFLC strenuously denied. Roberto Garreton stated that his investigation in the town of Goma turned up allegations of disappearances, torture and killings. He quoted , an aide to Mobutu, as saying that killings and disappearances should be expected in wartime.

Kabila's forces launched an offensive in March 1997, and demanded that the Kinshasa government surrender. The rebels took Kasenga on 27 March. The government denied the rebels' success, starting a long pattern of false statements from the Defense Minister on the progress and conduct of the war. Negotiations were proposed in late March, and on 2 April a new Prime Minister of Zaire, Étienne Tshisekedi—a longtime rival of Mobutu—was installed. Kabila, by this point in control of roughly one-quarter of the country, dismissed this as irrelevant and warned Tshisekedi that he would have no part in a new government if he accepted the post.

The ADFLC made consistent progress in its advance from the east throughout April 1997, and by May its troops had reached the outskirts of Kinshasa. Mobutu fled Kinshasa on 16 May, and the "libérateurs" (liberators) entered the capital without serious resistance. Mobutu fled the country and died in exile in Morocco four months later. Kabila proclaimed himself president on 17 May 1997; he immediately ordered a violent crackdown to restore order, and began an attempt at reorganisation of the nation.

Unwelcome support from other African nations
When Kabila gained control of the capital in May 1997, he faced substantial obstacles to governing the country, which he renamed the Democratic Republic of Congo (DRC) from Zaïre. Beyond political jostling among various groups to gain power and an enormous external debt, his foreign backers proved unwilling to leave when asked. The conspicuous Rwandan presence in the capital rankled many Congolese, who began to see Kabila as a pawn of foreign powers.

Tensions reached new heights on 14 July 1998, when Kabila dismissed his Rwandan chief of staff James Kabarebe, and replaced him with a native Congolese, Célestin Kifwa. Although the move chilled what was already a troubled relationship with Rwanda, Kabila softened the blow by making Kabarebe the military adviser to his successor.

Two weeks later, Kabila chose to abandon his previous decision. He thanked Rwanda for its help, and ordered all Rwandan and Ugandan military forces to leave the country. Within 24 hours, Rwandan military advisers living in Kinshasa were unceremoniously flown out. The people most alarmed by this order were the Banyamulenge Tutsi of eastern Congo. Their tensions with neighboring ethnic groups had been a contributing factor in the genesis of the First Congo War and they were also used by Rwanda to affect events across the border in the DRC.

1998–1999

On 2 August 1998, the Banyamulenge in Goma erupted into rebellion. Rwanda offered them immediate assistance, and early in August a well-armed rebel group, the Rally for Congolese Democracy (RCD)—composed primarily of Banyamulenge and backed by Rwanda and Uganda—emerged. This group quickly came to dominate the resource-rich eastern provinces, and based its operations in Goma. The RCD quickly took control of the towns of Bukavu and Uvira in the Kivus. The Tutsi-led Rwandan government allied with Uganda, and Burundi also retaliated, occupying a portion of northeastern Congo. To help remove the occupying Rwandans, President Kabila enlisted the aid of refugee Hutus in eastern Congo and began to agitate public opinion against the Tutsis, resulting in several public lynchings in the streets of Kinshasa. On 12 August a loyalist army major broadcast a message urging resistance from a radio station in Bunia in eastern Congo: "People must bring a machete, a spear, an arrow, a hoe, spades, rakes, nails, truncheons, electric irons, barbed wire, stones, and the like, in order, dear listeners, to kill the Rwandan Tutsis."

The Rwandan government also challenged current borders by claiming a substantial part of eastern Congo as "historically Rwandan". The Rwandans alleged that Kabila was organising a genocide against their Tutsi brethren in the Kivu region. The degree to which Rwandan intervention was motivated by a desire to protect the Banyamulenge, as opposed to using them as a smokescreen for its regional aspirations after ousting Mobutu, is still being debated.

In a bold move, Rwandan soldiers under the command of James Kabarebe hijacked three planes and flew them to the government base of Kitona on the Atlantic coast. The planes landed in the middle of the Kitona base, but the motley collection of troops there (ex-FAZ, but also Angolan UNITA elements and former Pascal Lissouba militiamen from Brazzaville) were in poor condition and in no condition to fight unless given food and weapons. They were quickly won over to the Rwandan side. More towns in the east and around Kitona fell in rapid succession, as the combined RCD, Rwandan and rebel soldiers overwhelmed government forces amid a flurry of ineffectual diplomatic efforts by various African nations. By 13 August, less than two weeks after the revolt had begun, rebels held the Inga hydroelectric station that provided power to Kinshasa as well as the port of Matadi through which most of Kinshasa's food passed. The diamond center of Kisangani fell into rebel hands on 23 August and forces advancing from the east had begun to threaten Kinshasa by late August. Uganda, while retaining joint support of the RCD with Rwanda, also created a rebel group that it supported exclusively, the Movement for the Liberation of Congo (MLC).

Despite the movement of the front lines, fighting continued throughout the country. Even as rebel forces advanced on Kinshasa, government forces continued to battle for control of towns in the east of the country. The Hutu militants with whom Kabila was co-operating were also a significant force in the east. Nevertheless, the fall of the capital and of Kabila, who had spent the previous weeks desperately seeking support from various African nations and Cuba, seemed increasingly certain.

The rebel offensive was abruptly reversed as Kabila's diplomatic efforts bore fruit. The first African countries to respond to Kabila's request for help were fellow members of the Southern African Development Community (SADC). While officially the SADC members are bound to a mutual defence treaty in the case of outside aggression, many member nations took a neutral stance to the conflict. However, the governments of Namibia, Zimbabwe and Angola supported the Kabila government after a meeting in Harare, Zimbabwe, on 19 August. Several more nations joined the conflict for Kabila in the following weeks: Chad, Libya and Sudan.

A multisided war thus began. In September 1998, Zimbabwean forces flown into Kinshasa held off a rebel advance that reached the outskirts of the capital, while Angolan units attacked northward from its borders and eastward from the Angolan territory of Cabinda, against the besieging rebel forces. This intervention by various nations saved the Kabila government and pushed the rebel front lines away from the capital. However, it was unable to defeat the rebel forces, and the advance threatened to escalate into direct conflict with the national armies of Uganda and Rwanda. In November 1998 a new Ugandan-backed rebel group, the Movement for the Liberation of Congo, was reported in the north of the country. On 6 November Rwandan President Paul Kagame admitted for the first time that Rwandan forces were assisting the RCD rebels for security reasons, apparently after a request by Nelson Mandela to advance peace talks. On 18 January 1999, Rwanda, Uganda, Angola, Namibia and Zimbabwe agreed on a ceasefire at a summit at Windhoek, Namibia but the RCD was not invited. Fighting thus continued.

Outside of Africa, most states remained neutral, but urged an end to the violence.

Foreign supporters of the Congo government

Zimbabwe

Robert Mugabe's administration dispatched elements of the Zimbabwe National Army to the Democratic Republic of the Congo in 1998. Mugabe, perhaps the most ardent supporter of intervention on Kabila's behalf, was the only major player involved in the conflict able to marshal a reasonably modern and experienced air force. Zimbabwe's military was also regarded as being one of the more well-equipped and professional of the region;being the decisive factor in the outcome of the war and exhibiting outstanding tactical proficiency. 

Zimbabwean strategy revolved around defending the person of Laurent Kabila only with allied forces, as Congolese forces were thought to be unreliable, then retake important settlements, and expel the rebels from the Kinshasa region. Mugabe's initial buildup in Kinshasa consisted of special forces along with some paratroops, reportedly numbering between 600 and 1,000. By August 1998, two more battalions had been dispatched. They were accompanied by some Soviet-manufactured T-54/55 tanks, Crocodile armoured personnel carriers, and EE-9 Cascavel scout cars flown into the capital on Angolan Air Force planes. The contingent grew to 3,800 around November, and peaked at 12,000 in January 2001. The Zimbabweans began leaving in 2002 and had completely withdrawn by the end of the year. Prior to this deployment, Zimbabwe had built up an apparently potent brigade-sized, combined arms, reaction force with efficient air support and professional competence; however the prolonged operations in the Congo are said to have damaged its credibility.

The Air Force of Zimbabwe made particularly effective use of its air power, hitting rebel and Rwandan offensives on Mbuji-Mayi with repeated strikes by BAE Hawks and Hawker Hunters. It also sustained heavy losses during the conflict, including three of its six Mil Mi-24 Hind helicopters, a transport aircraft, and an unidentified interceptor, probably a Chinese Chengdu J-7. Despite the effectiveness of its highly mobile, big-gunned Eland-90 and Cascavel armoured cars, Zimbabwean ground forces also lost a significant number, either captured or destroyed by the rebel coalition. As hardware losses multiplied, Western donors—including the International Monetary Fund and the World Bank placed their aid programmes to Harare under review, denying Mugabe the foreign currency he needed to buy spare parts valued at $600,000,000 for fighting vehicles then employed in the Congo.

Namibia
Under the direction of President Sam Nujoma, Namibia became involved in the Congo on behalf of its commitment to the Southern African Development Community. Nujoma, a longtime ally of Kabila, claimed he could not refuse the requests for military assistance from Zimbabwe and Angola. Windhoek's ruling SWAPO party had interests in Kinshasa similar to those claimed by Mugabe, including lucrative fish exports and a valuable stake in the Societé Minière de Bakwanga. In February 1999, Namibian Defence Force personnel in the Congo numbered barely 1,000: likely a single infantry battalion group with staff, artillery, logistics support and a flight of Allouette Helicopters and Y-12 transport aircraft from the Namibian Air Force. Between 2000 and 2001, this figure may have fluctuated between 1,600 and 2,000, though Namibian troops remained of little importance to the conflict. They were withdrawn by 2002, by which point 30 servicemen had been killed in action and the war effort was costing Namibia $150,000 a day.

The Namibian intervention was greeted with intense criticism by opposition parties, as well as neighboring South Africa and several Western donors. The European Union expressed concern that Nujoma was misusing his country's development funds for the Congo expedition, and individual member states—including Finland—cut off financial aid. A furious diplomatic row also ensued with South African authorities after they suspended all outgoing military exports to the NDF.

Angola
The Angolan government had fought against Mobutu Sésé Seko in the First Congo War because of his support for rebel UNITA in the Angolan Civil War. The Angolan government wanted to eliminate UNITA operations in southern Congo, which exchanged diamonds extracted from rebel-held Angola for foreign weapons. Angola had no confidence that a new president would be more effective than Kabila and feared that continued fighting would lead to a power vacuum that could only help UNITA. The intervention of the experienced Angolan forces was essential in deciding the outcome of both wars.

Chad
Kabila had originally discounted the possibility of support from Françafrique (Francophone Africa) but after a summit meeting in Libreville, Gabon, on 24 September, Chad agreed to send 2,000 troops. France had encouraged Chad to join as a means of regaining influence in a region where the French had retreated after the 1994 genocide committed against Tutsi in Rwanda. Nevertheless, Chadian intervention resulted in a fiasco. Its forces were accused of serious human rights violations and looting, virtually from their arrival in the country. They withdrew very quickly under international and national pressure and opprobrium.

Sudan
Unconfirmed reports in September indicated that forces of the government of Sudan were fighting rebels in Orientale Province, close to the Sudanese and Ugandan borders. However, Sudan did not establish a significant military presence inside the DRC, though it continued to offer extensive support to three Ugandan rebel groups—the Lord's Resistance Army, the Uganda National Rescue Front II and the Allied Democratic Forces—in retaliation for Ugandan support for the Sudan People's Liberation Army.

1999–2000

On 5 April 1999, tensions within the RCD about the dominance of the Banyamulenge reached a boiling point when RCD leader Ernest Wamba dia Wamba moved his base from Goma to Uganda-controlled Kisangani to head a breakaway faction known as RCD-Kisangani, which later became The Forces for Renewal. A further sign of a break occurred when President Yoweri Museveni of Uganda and Kabila signed a ceasefire accord on 18 April in Sirte, Libya, following the mediation of Libyan leader Muammar al-Gaddafi, but both the RCD and Rwanda refused to take part.

On 16 May Wamba was ousted as head of the RCD in favour of a pro-Rwanda figure, Dr. Emile Ilunga. Seven days later the various factions of the RCD clashed over control of Kisangani. On 8 June rebel factions met to try to create a common front against Kabila. Despite these efforts, the creation by Uganda of the new province of Ituri sparked the ethnic clash of the Ituri conflict, sometimes referred to as a "war within a war".

Nevertheless, diplomatic circumstances contributed to the first ceasefire of the war. In July 1999 the Lusaka Ceasefire Agreement was signed by the six warring countries (Democratic Republic of Congo, Angola, Namibia, Zimbabwe, Rwanda and Uganda) and, on 1 August, the MLC (the RCD refused to sign until 31 August). Under the terms of the agreement, forces from all sides, under a Joint Military Commission, would co-operate in tracking, disarming and documenting all armed groups in the Congo, especially those forces identified with the 1994 Rwandan genocide.

Few provisions, however, were made to actually disarm the militias. The United Nations Security Council deployed about 90 liaison personnel in August 1999 to support the ceasefire. However, in the following months all sides accused the others of repeatedly breaking the cease-fire, and it became clear that small incidents could trigger attacks.

Tensions between Uganda and Rwanda escalated as units of the Uganda People's Defense Force and the Rwandan Patriotic Army clashed in Kisangani on the morning of 7 August. Fighting broke out again between the two armies on the evening of 14 August; fighting occurred throughout much of Kisangani, including in the airport and on major roads. The conflict lasted until 17 August, when a ceasefire was called that day. Both sides used heavy weapons during these clashes. As reported by the International Crisis Group, the fighting was a result of differences over the objectives and strategies used during the war.B

In November government-controlled television in Kinshasa claimed that Kabila's army had been rebuilt and was now prepared to fulfil its "mission to liberate" the country. Rwandan-supported rebel forces launched a major offensive and approached Kinshasa but were eventually repelled.

By 24 February 2000, the UN authorised a force of 5,537 troops, the United Nations Organization Mission in the Democratic Republic of the Congo (known by the French acronym, MONUC), to monitor the cease-fire. However, fighting continued between rebels and government forces and between Rwandan and Ugandan forces. Numerous clashes and offensives occurred throughout the country, most notably heavy fighting between Uganda and Rwanda in Kisangani in May and June 2000.

On 9 August 2000 a government offensive in Equateur Province along the Ubangi River was repulsed near Libenge by MLC forces. Military operations and diplomatic efforts made by the UN, African Union and Southern African Development Community failed to make any headway.

2001

Assassination of Laurent-Désiré Kabila 

On 16 January 2001, Laurent-Désiré Kabila was shot and killed at the presidential palace in Kinshasa. The government initially stated that Kabila was wounded but still alive when he was flown to Zimbabwe for intensive care. The circumstances of his assassination are unclear, and have been the subject of considerable rumours and disagreements. The consensus is that Kabila was shot by one of his bodyguards, the 18-year-old Rashidi Mizele, a kadogo (child soldier). Mizele had previously been misidentified as Rashidi Kasereka.

Two days later the government announced on state television that the desperate attempt by Zimbabwean medical personnel to save Kabila had failed and that Kabila had died from his injuries. His remains were returned for a state funeral on 26 January 2001.

Shortly after the assassination, the French newspaper Le Monde published an explosive story in which self-identified assassination plotters revealed documents and details of the plot to murder Kabila. The plotters were mainly kadogos who had been under Kabila's command since 1996, and were aggrieved over their poor treatment. The catalyst for the assassination appeared to be the execution of 47 kadogos accused of plotting against Kabila. The execution, witnessed by Kabila, took place the day before his assassination.

While the role of the disgruntled kadogos is relatively well-established, there have been some attempts to argue that they were under the influence of external actors who sought to overthrow Kabila. Some Congolese officials attempted to implicate their principal enemies by alleging that the Rwandans masterminded the operation. Some observers have lent credibility to these allegations, including Al-Jazeera's documentary, "Murder in Kinshasa", which alleges that a Lebanese diamond dealer allegedly organised the logistics of the organisation. Others have speculated that the Angolans (due to Kabila's complicity in helping the Angolan rebel group UNITA channel funds through the DRC) or even the Americans were involved in the assassination. There is, as yet, no proof that Mizele or the kadogos were acting under orders from an external source.

Joseph Kabila becomes president 
By unanimous vote of the Congolese parliament, his son, Joseph Kabila, was sworn in as president to replace him. That he won the election was largely due to Robert Mugabe's backing, and the fact that most parliamentarians had been handpicked by the elder Kabila. In February, the new president met Rwandan President Paul Kagame in the United States. Rwanda, Uganda, and the rebels agreed to a UN pullout plan. Uganda and Rwanda began pulling troops back from the front line.
Joseph Kabila has been described as "a more adept political leader than his father". As Chris Talbot notes, an article in The Washington Post "favourably contrasted Joseph Kabila – Western-educated and English-speaking – with his father." The author of the Washington Post article writes that Joseph Kabila gave diplomats "hope that things have changed", in contrast to Laurent-Désiré Kabila, who "stood as the major impediment to a peaceful settlement of the war launched in August 1998 to unseat him." A peace accord Laurent signed in the summer of 1999, the Lusaka Ceasefire Agreement, "remained unfulfilled largely because he kept staging new offensives while blocking deployment of U.N. peacekeepers in government-held territory." To compare, according to an analyst from the London-based Economist Intelligence Unit, "The only obstruction had been Kabila because the [Lusaka] accord called for the government's democratic transition and that was a threat to his power."

UN investigates illegal exploitation of minerals 
In April 2001, a UN panel of experts investigated the illegal exploitation of diamonds, cobalt, coltan, gold and other lucrative resources in the Congo. The report accused Rwanda, Uganda and Zimbabwe of systematically exploiting Congolese resources and recommended the Security Council impose sanctions.

2002
In 2002 Rwanda's situation in the war began to worsen. Many members of the RCD either gave up fighting or decided to join Kabila's government. Moreover, the Banyamulenge, the backbone of Rwanda's militia forces, became increasingly tired of control from Kigali and the unending conflict. A number of them mutinied, leading to violent clashes between them and Rwandan forces.

At the same time, the western Congo was becoming increasingly secure under the younger Kabila. International aid was resumed as inflation was brought under control.

In March, the RCD-Goma faction captured Moliro, a town located on the coast of Lake Tanganyika, from government forces. According to said faction, the town was shelled by government gunboats the following day in response. The capture was seen as a violation of the Lusaka Ceasefire Agreement.

Peace agreements (April–December 2002)
Under the leadership of South Africa, peace talks held in that country between April and December 2002 led to the signing of a "comprehensive peace agreement." The Sun City Agreement was formalised on 19 April 2002. It was a framework for providing the Congo with a unified, multiparty government and democratic elections. However, critics noted that there were no stipulations regarding the unification of the army, which weakened the effectiveness of the agreement. There were several reported breaches of the Sun City agreement, but it has seen a reduction in the fighting.
On 30 July 2002, Rwanda and the Democratic Republic of Congo signed a peace deal known as the Pretoria Accord after five days of talks in Pretoria, South Africa. The talks centered on two issues. One was the withdrawal of the estimated 20,000 Rwandan soldiers in the Congo. The other was the rounding up of the ex-Rwandan soldiers and the dismantling of the Hutu militia known as Interahamwe, which took part in Rwanda's 1994 genocide and continues to operate out of eastern Congo. Rwanda had previously refused to withdraw until the Hutu militias were dealt with.

Signed on 6 September, the Luanda Agreement formalised peace between Congo and Uganda. The treaty aimed to get Uganda to withdraw its troops from Bunia and to improve the relationship between the two countries, but implementation proved troublesome. Eleven days later, the first Rwandan soldiers were withdrawn from the eastern DRC. On 5 October Rwanda announced the completion of its withdrawal; MONUC confirmed the departure of over 20,000 Rwandan soldiers.

On 21 October, the UN published its expert panel's report on the pillage of natural resources by armed groups. Both Rwanda and Uganda rejected accusations that senior political and military figures were involved in illicit trafficking of plundered resources. Zimbabwe Defense Minister Sydney Sekeramayi says the Zimbabwean military withdrew from the DRC in October 2002, but in June 2006 reporters said a 50-man force had stayed in the DRC to protect Kabila.

On 17 December 2002, the Congolese parties of the Inter Congolese Dialogue (the national government, the MLC, the RCD, the RCD-ML, the RCD-N, the domestic political opposition, representatives of civil society and the Mai Mai) signed the Global and All-Inclusive Agreement. The agreement described a plan for transitional governance that would have result in legislative and presidential election within two years of its signing and marked the formal end of the Second Congo War.

Pygmy genocide (late 2002 – early 2003)
 
At the end of 2002 through January 2003, around 60,000 Pygmy civilians and 10,000 combatants were killed in an extermination campaign known as "Effacer le tableau" by the Movement for the Liberation of Congo. Human rights activists have made demands for the massacre to be recognized as a genocide.

2003 onwards: Transitional Government

On 18 July 2003, the Transitional Government came into being as specified in the Global and All-Inclusive Agreement out of the warring parties. The agreement obliges the parties to carry out a plan to reunify the country, disarm and integrate the warring parties and hold elections. There were numerous problems, resulting in continued instability in much of the country and a delay in the scheduled national elections from June 2005 to July 2006.

The main cause for the continued weakness of the Transitional Government is the refusal by the former warring parties to give up power to a centralised and neutral national administration. Some belligerents maintained administrative and military command-and-control structures separate from that of the Transitional Government, but as the International Crisis Group has reported, these have gradually been reduced. A high level of official corruption siphoning money away from civil servants, soldiers and infrastructure projects causes further instability.

On 30 July 2006 the first elections were held in the DRC after the populace approved a new constitution. A second round was held on 30 October.

Aftermath and legacy

Areas of continuing conflict

The fragility of the state has allowed continued violence and human rights abuses in the east. There are three significant centres of conflict:
 North and South Kivu, where a weakened FDLR continues to threaten the Rwandan border and the Banyamulenge, where Rwanda supports RCD-Goma rebels against Kinshasa (see Kivu conflict), and where local conflicts continue to fuel violence;
 Ituri, where MONUC / MONUSCO has proved unable to contain the numerous militia and groups driving the Ituri conflict;
 Northern Katanga, where Mai-Mai Militias slipped out of the control of Kinshasa (see Katanga insurgency).

The ethnic violence between Hutu- and Tutsi-aligned forces has been a driving impetus for much of the conflict, with people on both sides fearing their annihilation. The Kinshasa- and Hutu-aligned forces enjoyed close relations as their interests in expelling the armies and proxy forces of Uganda and Rwanda dovetail.

While the Uganda- and Rwanda-aligned forces worked closely together to gain territory at the expense of Kinshasa, competition over access to resources created a fissure in their relationship. There were reports that Uganda permitted Kinshasa to send arms to the Hutu FDLR via territory held by Uganda-backed rebels as Uganda, Kinshasa and the Hutus are all seeking, in varying degrees, to check the influence of Rwanda and its affiliates.

Rwanda and Ugandan backing of rebels
Rwanda backed rebels due to fears of Hutu rebels on its border. The Kinshasa government was suspicious of Kigali's influence over the region, as Rwanda has occupied the area numerous times and some witnesses confirm that Rwanda has profited from the looting of Congolese minerals. Consequently, Rwanda allegedly supported the continuing rebellion of General Nkunda in Congo. Nkunda was, however, arrested by Rwandan police in 2009. The DRC sought assurance that Kigali aligned forces have no conflict-mineral or territorial interests in eastern Congo.

On 19 December 2005 the United Nations International Court of Justice ruled that the DRC's sovereignty had been violated by Uganda, and that DRC had lost billions of dollars worth of resources. The DRC government has asked for $10 billion in compensation. Though the ICJ has taken many steps to ensure that war crimes and crimes against humanity will be prosecuted, the International Monetary Fund and the World Bank rewarded both Uganda and Rwanda with debt relief packages for improving their economic health during a time when much of their increased revenue was partially a direct result of illegally importing conflicted minerals from the DRC. In this case, international institutions such as the IMF and WB are allegedly at odds with international laws and charters. Both the IMF and WB have been accused of helping to facilitate the conflict in the DRC by rewarding combatants.

Environmental impact 
The war has caused substantial environmental damage. The forests of Congo are a major biodiversity hot spot, housing The Congo Basin which is widely known as the second greatest tropical rain forest in the world and the largest forest in Africa.

Animals and bushmeat trade

On account of the war the Republic of Congo saw their elephant population halve in size, their hippo population go from 22,000 to 900 and their great ape population decrease by 77%-93% between 1998 to 2015.

With up to 3.4 million people being displaced in Congo as a result of the civil war, many moved into Congo’s forests, where they hunted bonobos, gorillas, elephants and more as bushmeat for survival and cleared forest land that were significant habitats for these many animals. Many of these individuals were either from the city where the hunting of certain animals was not a taboo or locals who had their tradition slowly broken down because of their need to survive. One such example had been the Bongando people in which a 2009 study by Kyoto University had observed a disintegration of their cultural interdiction of eating bonobos as influenced by the civil war. During the conflict many of the front lines were located within bonobos reserves, further contributing to the decline in their population.

Government instability and the lack of government enforcement allowed new illegal militia mining camps to form which located themselves deep within Congo’s forest. There, bushmeat became the main source of food. On top of that, the mass number of people entering the forests in conjunction with the mines’ unsanitary conditions introduced an increased risk of disease for animals such as gorillas. The government instability and the dangers of war also ceased much of the conservation and protection efforts occurring in Congo at the time, enabling the numerous rampant rebel groups present in Congo to openly partake in poaching.

Military assistance having been obstructed by surrounding African countries, Congo was pushed into entering numerous lumber leases with German, Chinese and Malaysian corporations to uphold their military activities. The roads emerging to support the new logging efforts opened nearby villages to receive easier means of transportation and access to deeper parts of Congo’s wildlife reserves. The result was a significant increase in bushmeat sales in villages near these logging sites.

The potential threat of rebel forces during the war caused many military officers controlling urban trade to leave their post. This created an open access market in the bushmeat and pet trade that was then undertaken by exploitative lower ranked soldiers looking for profit. The result was an observed quintuple increase of protected animal sales in urban markets in north-eastern parts of Congo around Garamba National Park. Meanwhile, in other northern parts of Congo, researchers in other studies have found a 23% increase in protected animal sales with the overall pattern being a significant increase in protected animal sales.

Deforestation

The war resulted in a loss of 1.31% of Congo's forests, a size comparable to Belgium.

The millions of displaced individuals led to needed to large-scale logging and deforestation to create arable land. These activities had an outsized effect due to the edge effect as a result of the forest fragmentation.

The Virunga National Park, Africa’s oldest national park, became the first endangered UN World Heritage Site. Its flora was cleared during both the first and second Congo war to make way for both the Rwandan and Congolese army.

Dispute over death toll 
The Human Security Report Project (HSRP) of Simon Fraser University has challenged the toll of 5.4 million war-related deaths between 1998 and 2008. It states that of the IRC's five periodic estimates, two that cover a period from 1998 to 2001 are flawed, and the reported 2.6 million deaths therein should not be included in the total death toll. The other three periodic IRC estimates cover a period from May 2001 – April 2007, and in which 2.83 million of the total 5.4 million deaths were reported. The HSRP argued that the estimates were built on a general death rate that was far too low for Congo, and that most of those people would have most likely died anyway. Thus, the IRC figure should be revised to 860,000 total war-related excess deaths.

In response to the criticism from HSRP, one of the authors of the IRC report argued the following: Although there may have been small statistical discrepancies in the original study, the IRC report had been widely peer-reviewed and was judged to be an accurate estimate of the war-related excess deaths.

See also
 Dongo conflict, 2009 conflict in the Democratic Republic of the Congo 
 Living in Emergency: Stories of Doctors Without Borders – documentary film about the work of Médecins Sans Frontières in DR Congo
 Child soldiers in the Democratic Republic of Congo

General:
 List of conflicts in Africa

Notes

References

Further reading
 Baregu, Mwesiga. "The Clones of 'Mr. Kurtz': Violence, War and Plunder in the DRC." African Journal of Political Science. African Association of Political Science. (2002), Vol 7 No. 2. p. 11–38. .
 Berkeley, Bill. (2001) The Graves Are Not Yet Full: Race, Tribe, and Power in the Heart of Africa. Basic Books. . A narrative approach illustrating how political figures manipulate large groups into violence. Not focused on the current Congo conflict, but useful in understanding "ethnic conflict" generally in Africa.
 Clark, John F. (2002) The African Stakes in the Congo War. New York: Palgrave Macmillan. . Uses a political science approach to understanding motivations and power struggles, but is not an account of specific incidents and individuals.
 Edgerton, Robert G. (2002) The Troubled Heart of Africa: A History of the Congo. St. Martin's Press. . There is a modicum of information on the troubles since 1996 in the latter sections.
 Gondola, Ch. Didier. (2002) The History of Congo, Greenwood Press, . Covers events up to January 2002.
 Miller, Eric. The Inability of Peacekeeping to Address the Security Dilemma. 2010.  . Covers the First and Second Congo Wars and its continued aftermath.
 Gerard Prunier, From Genocide to Continental War: The "Congolese" Conflict and the Crisis of Contemporary Africa, C. Hurst & Co, 2009, . Covers both the First and Second Congo Wars.
 Renton, David; Seddon, David; Zeilig, Leo (2007). The Congo: Plunder & Resistance. New York: Zed Books. .
 Stearns, Jason (2011). Dancing in the Glory of Monsters: The Collapse of the Congo and the Great War of Africa. New York: PublicAffairs. .
 Turner, Thomas. (2007) The Congo Wars: Conflict, Myth, and Reality. New York: Zed Books. .

External links

 BBC Q&A on DR Congo conflict – BBC: Updated timeline of Congo history, with emphasis on the war
 Global IDP Database: Overview of warring parties
 Globalsecurity.org site on Congo Civil War

 
Wars involving the states and peoples of Africa
Civil wars involving the states and peoples of Africa
1990s in Angola
2000s in Angola
Military history of Angola
Military history of Burundi
Military history of Chad
Military history of the Democratic Republic of the Congo
Military history of Namibia
Military history of Rwanda
Military history of Uganda
Military history of Zimbabwe
Military history of Zambia
Natural resource conflicts
Ethnicity-based civil wars
Proxy wars